SS Richard Halliburton was a Liberty ship built in the United States during World War II. She was named after Richard Halliburton, an American traveler, adventurer, and author.

Construction 
Richard Halliburton was laid down on 31 August 1944, under a Maritime Commission (MARCOM) contract, MC hull 2323, by J.A. Jones Construction, Panama City, Florida; sponsored by Mrs. Evelyn Marshall, wife of regional MARCOM auditor, and launched on 10 October 1944.

History
She was allocated to Isbrandstsen Steamship Co. Inc., 23 September 1944. On 10 March 1946, she was laid up in the National Defense Reserve Fleet, Wilmington, North Carolina.

She was sold for scrapping, 14 March 1961, to Union Minerals and Alloys Corp., for $48,139.89. She was withdrawn from the fleet, 31 May 1961.

References

Bibliography 

 
 
 
 

 

Liberty ships
Ships built in Panama City, Florida
1944 ships
Wilmington Reserve Fleet